Frontside is a Polish metalcore / deathcore band from Sosnowiec, Poland, formed by Astek and Demon in 1993. They compose and perform their songs in both English and Polish.

History 
The band was formed in 1993 in Sosnowiec, Poland by Astek and Demon. Early Frontside productions were hardcore songs with influence from many other genres, such as hip-hop. Compositions often included rapping, samples and scratching. However, these musical experiments ended on Our Is Kingdom... in 2001; they were replaced by riffs akin to thrash and death metal and harsh vocals. In mid-2003, Auman from the Polish thrash metal band Totem joined as the new vocalist when Astek left, and Daron became the new guitarist after Simon left. Together, they changed the band's musical direction more toward death metal, with characteristic riffs and death growling. Along with those aspects, the band also incorporated clean vocals.

Members

Current members
Mariusz "Demon" Dzwonek – rhythm guitar, backing vocals (1993–present)
Wojciech "Novak" Nowak – bass (1997–present)
Marcin "Auman" Rdest – lead vocals (2004–present)
Dariusz "Daron" Kupis – lead guitar (2003–present)
Tomasz "Toma" Ochab – drums (2005–present)

Former members
 Sebastian "Astek" Flasza – lead vocals (1993-2003)
 Szymon "Simon" Dzieciaszek – rhythm guitar (1996-2003)
 Paweł "Destroy" Śmieciuch – drums (1996-2003)
 Wojciech Sitarz – rhythm guitar (1993-1995)
 Robert Siwek – rhythm guitar (1993-1995)
 Michał Markowicz – bass (1993-1997) 
Touring musicians
Łukasz "Pachu" Pach - lead vocals

Timeline

Discography

Studio albums

Music videos

References

Polish heavy metal musical groups
Deathcore musical groups
Musical groups established in 1993
Musical quintets
1993 establishments in Poland
Mystic Production artists